Trnovci may refer to:
 Trnovci, Mogila, North Macedonia
 Trnovci, Sveti Tomaž, Slovenia